Brett Bochy (born August 27, 1987) is an American former professional baseball pitcher. He played Major League Baseball (MLB) for the San Francisco Giants in 2014 and 2015.

Professional career

Amateur and Minors
Bochy attended Poway High School and was drafted by the San Francisco Giants in the 20th round of the 2010 Major League Baseball Draft out of the University of Kansas.

Bochy began his professional career in 2011 where he played for the Augusta Green Jackets in the Class-A level, making 35 appearances out of the bullpen going 1–0 with a 1.38 ERA. In 2012, he was promoted to the Double-A level team, the Richmond Flying Squirrels. With the Double-A team in 2012, Bochy made 41 relief appearances going 7–3 with a 2.53 ERA. In 2013, Bochy was promoted to the Triple-A level team, the Fresno Grizzlies. With the Triple-A team in 2013, Bochy made 45 relief appearances going 1–1 with a 3.99 ERA.

Bochy was invited to spring training with the Giants in 2013. He was told by his father, manager Bruce Bochy, over dinner that he had not made the team. Bochy started the 2014 season with the Rookie League level team, the AZL Giants. He played 2 games out of the bullpen with 1 win and was promoted to Triple-A again. With Triple-A, he made 35 appearances going 4–4 with a 3.83 ERA.

San Francisco Giants

2014
Bochy was called up to the majors for the first time on September 2, 2014, when the rosters expanded to 40 men. He made his Major League debut on September 13, 2014, escaping a bases loaded jam. He played 3 games for the Giants compiling a 5.40 ERA. Although the Giants clinched a Wild Card spot with an 88–74 record, Bochy did not participate in their postseason run but he was still eligible to receive his first career championship ring as the Giants won the 2014 World Series over the Kansas City Royals. On November 3, 2014, Bochy was outrighted off of the 40-man roster.

2015
Bochy started the season with the Triple-A Sacramento River Cats.  On July 3, he was designated for assignment to clear space on the 40-man roster. Bochy remained with the organization and was recalled to the Giants on September 7.  He appeared in 4 games, pitching 3 innings without allowing a run. On October 19, 2015, Bochy was outrighted off of the 40-man roster.

After the 2015 season, Bochy became a free agent and retired from baseball in order to attend graduate school and become a real estate agent.

International 
In 2020, Bochy was selected to the French national baseball team for the 2021 World Baseball Classic qualifier in Arizona. His dad, Bruce, was manager of the team.

Personal
He is the son of former Giants manager, Bruce Bochy. Bochy's brother Greg played four years of minor league baseball with the San Diego Padres organization. His uncle Joe is a scout for the Padres.

References

External links
, or Retrosheet, or University of Kansas Athletics

1987 births
Living people
Arizona League Giants players
Augusta GreenJackets players
Baseball players from San Diego
Fresno Grizzlies players
Kansas Jayhawks baseball players
Major League Baseball pitchers
Richmond Flying Squirrels players
Sacramento River Cats players
San Francisco Giants players